Abel Tesfamariam (born 16 May 1995) is an Eritrean-Filipino alpine skier based in Geneva, Switzerland. Tesfamariam represented the Philippines at the 2012 Youth Winter Olympics in Innsbruck, Austria.

References

External links
Abel Tesfamarian - 2012 Youth Olympics Profile

1995 births
Filipino male alpine skiers
Filipino people of Eritrean descent
Living people
Filipino expatriate sportspeople in Switzerland
Alpine skiers at the 2012 Winter Youth Olympics